Beginning shortly after the city's incorporation as a city in 1846, elections have been held in the mayor of Manchester, New Hampshire. The following article provides information on the elections for mayor in the city during the 19th century.

Election laws and history
The rules of the original 1846 city charter, in effect for the city's earliest elections, required that, to be elected, a candidate needed to receive a majority of the vote in a mayoral election. If no candidate received a majority, or if the winning candidate refused to take office, further election(s) would be held until an election produced a candidate with a majority of the vote.

From 1846 to 1857, mayors served for a one-year term, expiring on the third Tuesday in March. From 1857 to 1872, the mayor's term expired on the last day of December. In 1873, the term ended annually on the third Tuesday in March, up until 1880, when it became a two-year term.

1846

The 1846 Manchester, New Hampshire mayoral elections were held to elect the mayor of Manchester, New Hampshire. The first election was part of the first municipal election held after Manchester formally became a city (having previously been a town), which was held on August 19, 1846. The August municipal election's mayoral election, however, failed to produce a winner, as first-place finisher Hiram Brown fell 17 votes shy of the majority threshold needed to win the election. A second election was held on September 1, which saw Brown win a majority.

The candidates in the August election were Hiram Brown, Thomas Brown, William C. Clarke, James McQueston, William Stephens, James Wilkins. Hiram Brown was affiliated with the Whig Party, Thomas Brown was affiliated with the Abolition Party, and Clarke was affiliated with the Democratic Party. Candidates in the September 1 election were Hiram Brown, Thomas Brown, Issac C. Flanders, Jacob F. James, William Stephens, and J. Sullivan Wiggin. Flanders was affiliated with the Democratic Party.

1847

The 1847 Manchester, New Hampshire mayoral elections were held on March 10, March 31, April 30, and May 22, 1847 to elect the mayor of Manchester, New Hampshire. The conclusive fourth election saw the election of Jacob F. James.

In the first three elections, no candidate had managed to reach the required majority threshold to win election. In the fourth election, Jacob F. James won election by receiving a majority of the vote.

1848

The 1848 Manchester, New Hampshire mayoral elections were held on March 18, April 8, and April 26, 1848 to elect the mayor of Manchester, New Hampshire. The conclusive third election saw the reelection of incumbent mayor Jacob F. James.

In the first two elections, no candidate had managed to reach the required majority threshold to win election. In the third election, Jacob F. James won election by receiving a majority of the vote.

The initial March 18 election had coincided with the elections for the city's aldermen.

1849

The 1849 Manchester, New Hampshire mayoral elections were held in April, May, and October 1849 to elect the mayor of Manchester, New Hampshire. The conclusive third election saw the election of Warren L. Lane.

In the first two elections, no candidate had managed to reach the required majority threshold to win election. In the third election, Warren L. Lane won election by receiving a majority of the vote.

The third election coincided with the October elections for the city's aldermen.

1850

The 1850 Manchester, New Hampshire mayoral election was held to elect the mayor of Manchester, New Hampshire. It saw the election of Moses Fellows, who unseated incumbent mayor Warren L. Lane. Fellows and Lane were the only two candidates running in the election, which coincided with the city's aldermanic elections.

1851

The 1851 Manchester, New Hampshire mayoral election was held to elect the mayor of Manchester, New Hampshire. It saw the reelection of Moses Fellows, who defeated challengers Walter French, Alonzo Smith, and D.L. Stevens. The election coincided with the city's aldermanic elections.

1852

The 1852 Manchester, New Hampshire mayoral election was held to elect the mayor of Manchester, New Hampshire. It saw the election of Frederick Smyth, who defeated Walter French, the only other candidate running in the election. The election coincided with the city's aldermanic elections.

1853

The 1853 Manchester, New Hampshire mayoral election was held to elect the mayor of Manchester, New Hampshire. It saw the reelection of Frederick Smyth, who defeated challenger Stevens James, the only other candidate running in the election. The election coincided with the city's aldermanic elections.

1854

The 1854 Manchester, New Hampshire mayoral election was held in March 1854 to elect the mayor of Manchester, New Hampshire. It saw the reelection of Frederick Smyth, who defeated challenger William C. Clarke, the only other candidate running in the election. This made Clarke the first mayor of the city to be elected to a third term. The election coincided with the city's aldermanic elections.

1855

The 1855 Manchester, New Hampshire mayoral election was held in March 1855 to elect the mayor of Manchester, New Hampshire. It saw the election of Theodore T. Abbott, who defeated Frederick G. Stark, the only other candidate running in the election. The election coincided with the city's aldermanic elections.

1856 (March)

The March 1856 Manchester, New Hampshire mayoral election was held to elect the mayor of Manchester, New Hampshire. It saw the reelection of Theodore T. Abbott, who defeated challenger George W. Morrison, the only other candidate running in the election. The election coincided with the city's aldermanic elections.

1856 (November)

The November 1856 Manchester, New Hampshire mayoral election was held to elect the mayor of Manchester, New Hampshire. It saw the election of Jacob F. James to a third nonconsecutive term. James defeated Isaac C. Flanders, the only other candidate running in the election. The election coincided with the city's aldermanic elections.

1857

The 1857 Manchester, New Hampshire mayoral election was held to elect the mayor of Manchester, New Hampshire. It saw the election of Alonzo Smith, who defeated both Edward W. Harringon and incumbent mayor Jacob F. James.

1858

The 1858 Manchester, New Hampshire mayoral election was held to elect the mayor of Manchester, New Hampshire. It saw the election of Edward W. Harrington, who unseated incumbent mayor Alonzo Smith.

1859

The 1859 Manchester, New Hampshire mayoral election was held to elect the mayor of Manchester, New Hampshire. It saw the reelection of Edward W. Harrington, who defeated challenger Bradbury Cilley.

1860

The 1860 Manchester, New Hampshire mayoral election was held to elect the mayor of Manchester, New Hampshire. It saw the election of David A. Bunton, who defeated Bradbury Cilley.

1861

The 1861 Manchester, New Hampshire mayoral election was held to elect the mayor of Manchester, New Hampshire. It saw the reelection of David A. Bunton, who defeated challenger James A. Weston.

1862

The 1862 Manchester, New Hampshire mayoral election was held to elect the mayor of Manchester, New Hampshire. It saw the reelection of Theodore T. Abbott to a third nonconsecutive term. Abbott defeated Theodore T. Abbott.

1863

The 1863 Manchester, New Hampshire mayoral election was held to elect the mayor of Manchester, New Hampshire. It saw the election of Frederick Smyth to a fourth nonconsecutive term, making him the first mayor of the city to be elected to a fourth term. Smyth was elected nearly unanimously, with the remainder of the vote being a scattering of write-in votes, with no single individual receiving more than five write-in votes.

1864

The 1864 Manchester, New Hampshire mayoral election was held to elect the mayor of Manchester, New Hampshire. It saw the election of Darwin J. Daniels, who defeated Joseph Kidder.

1865

The 1865 Manchester, New Hampshire mayoral election was held in August 1865 to elect the mayor of Manchester, New Hampshire. It was held in August after the death in office of mayor Darwin J. Daniels. It saw the election of John Hosley, who defeated Joseph B. Clark.

1866

The 1866 Manchester, New Hampshire mayoral election was held to elect the mayor of Manchester, New Hampshire. It saw the election of Joseph B. Clark, who defeated former mayor Edward W. Harrington.

1867

The 1867 Manchester, New Hampshire mayoral election was held to elect the mayor of Manchester, New Hampshire. It saw the election of James A. Weston, who unseated incumbent mayor Joseph B. Clark.

1868

The 1868 Manchester, New Hampshire mayoral election was held to elect the mayor of Manchester, New Hampshire. It saw the election of Isaac W. Smith, who unseated incumbent mayor James A. Weston.

1869

The 1869 Manchester, New Hampshire mayoral election was held to elect the mayor of Manchester, New Hampshire. It saw the election of James A. Weston, who was elected to a second nonconsecutive term by unseating incumbent mayor Isaac W. Smith.

1870

The 1870 Manchester, New Hampshire mayoral election was held to elect the mayor of Manchester, New Hampshire. It saw the reelection of James A. Weston to a third overall term, defeating Peter Chandler and Andrew C. Wallace.

1871

The 1871 Manchester, New Hampshire mayoral election was held to elect the mayor of Manchester, New Hampshire. It saw the election of Person Colby Cheney, who defeated former mayor John Holsey.

1872

The 1872 Manchester, New Hampshire mayoral election was held on December 10, 1872 to elect the mayor of Manchester, New Hampshire. It saw the election of Charles H. Bartlett, who defeated Joseph Kidder.

1873

The 1873 Manchester, New Hampshire mayoral election was held to elect the mayor of Manchester, New Hampshire. It saw the election of James A. Weston to a second nonconsecutive term. Weston defeated Charles Kenniston and incumbent mayor John P. Newell (who had been appointed by the city's aldermen and Common Council after the resignation of Person C. Cheney).

1875

The 1875 Manchester, New Hampshire mayoral election was held to elect the mayor of Manchester, New Hampshire. It saw the election of Alpheus Gay, who defeated Ira Cross and Charles Kennison.

1876

The 1876 Manchester, New Hampshire mayoral election was held to elect the mayor of Manchester, New Hampshire. It saw the election of Ira Cross, who defeated incumbent mayor Alpheus Gay.

1877

The 1877 Manchester, New Hampshire mayoral election was held to elect the mayor of Manchester, New Hampshire. It saw the reelection of Ira Cross, who defeated Ezra W. Bartlett and former mayor Alpheus Gay.

1878 (March)

The March 1878 Manchester, New Hampshire mayoral election was held to elect the mayor of Manchester, New Hampshire. It saw the election of John L. Kelly, who defeated Richard Goodwin and former mayor Alpheus Gay.

1878 (November)

The November 1878 Manchester, New Hampshire mayoral election was held to elect the mayor of Manchester, New Hampshire. It saw the reelection of John L. Kelly, who defeated Andrew C. Wallace.

1880

The 1880 Manchester, New Hampshire mayoral election was held to elect the mayor of Manchester, New Hampshire. It saw the election of Horace B. Putnam, who defeated Frank Dowst.

This was the first election after the city's mayoral terms were extended from one-year to two-years.

1882

The 1882 Manchester, New Hampshire mayoral election was held to elect the mayor of Manchester, New Hampshire. It saw the reelection of Horace B. Putnam, who defeated former mayor Alpheus Gay.

1884

The 1884 Manchester, New Hampshire mayoral election was held to elect the mayor of Manchester, New Hampshire. It saw the election of George H. Stearns, who defeated Joseph Kidder and Lewis Simons.

1886

The 1886 Manchester, New Hampshire mayoral election was held to elect the mayor of Manchester, New Hampshire. It saw the election of John Holsey to a second nonconsecutive term. Holsey defeated Albert Tasker and incumbent mayor George H. Stearns.

1888

The 1888 Manchester, New Hampshire mayoral election was held to elect the mayor of Manchester, New Hampshire. It saw the election of David B. Varney, who defeated William Corey and Augustus Stevens.

1890

The 1890 Manchester, New Hampshire mayoral election was held to elect the mayor of Manchester, New Hampshire. It saw the election of Edgar J. Knowlton, who defeated Thomas W. Lane and Augustus Stevens.

1892

The 1892 Manchester, New Hampshire mayoral election was held to elect the mayor of Manchester, New Hampshire. It saw the reelection of Edgar J. Knowlton, who defeated John C. Bickford and Augustus Stevens.

1894

The 1894 Manchester, New Hampshire mayoral election was held to elect the mayor of Manchester, New Hampshire. It saw the election of Republican candidate William C. Clarke, who defeated Democratic candidate Charles C. Hayes, People's candidate Sumner F. Claflin, and Prohibition candidate John Gillis.

1896

The 1896 Manchester, New Hampshire mayoral election was held to elect the mayor of Manchester, New Hampshire. It saw the reelection of William C. Clarke, who defeated John Bickford, Sumner F. Claflin, and Charles C. Hayes.

1898

The 1898 Manchester, New Hampshire mayoral election was held to elect the mayor of Manchester, New Hampshire. It saw the reelection of William C. Clarke to a third consecutive term. Clarke defeated Charles C. Hayes and Earle Payne.

References

 19th
19th century in New Hampshire